Blessed is an album by the American composer, saxophonist and clarinet player Joe Maneri, with his son, violinist Mat Maneri, recorded in 1997 and released on the ECM label.

Reception
The AllMusic review by Thom Jurek stated: "It has within it the basis of a new study of harmonic improvisation, and a manner of execution and construction that show respect and tenderness not only toward one another as family, but to the music they approach with the sole intention of changing it from the inside out. Blessed is remarkable for its close dancing with the infinite".

Track listing
All compositions by Joe Maneri and Mat Maneri except as indicated
 "At the Gate" - 3:53 
 "There Are No Doors" - 4:22 
 "Sixty-One Joys" (Mat Maneri) - 4:01 
 "From Loosened Soil" - 11:05 
 "Five Fantasies" - 5:36 
 "Never Said a Mumblin' Word" (Traditional) - 5:38 
 "Is Nothing Near?" - 9:03 
 "Body and Soul" (Frank Eyton, Johnny Green, Edward Heyman, Robert Sour) - 6:16 
 "Race You Home" - 1:12 
 "Gardenias for Gardenis" (Joe Maneri) - 1:42 
 "Outside the Whole Thing" - 5:36 
 "Blessed" (Mat Maneri) - 5:05 
Recorded at Hardstudios in Winterthur, Switzerland in October 1997

Personnel
Joe Maneri - clarinet, alto saxophone, tenor saxophone, piano
Mat Maneri - violin, electric 6 string violin, baritone violin, electric 5-string viola

References

 
 

1998 albums
ECM Records albums
Joe Maneri albums